Alexandr Zaboev (born 1 September 1989) is a Russian pair skater. From 2012 to 2014, he skated with Natalja Zabijako for Estonia, placing tenth at the 2014 European Championships. Although they qualified a spot for Estonia in the pairs' event at the 2014 Winter Olympics, they did not compete in Sochi because Zaboev's fast-track citizenship application was declined.

Personal life 
Zaboev was born in Sverdlovsk, Russian SFSR, Soviet Union. In addition to skating, he competed in ballroom dancing until 2004.

Skating career 
Zaboev began skating in 1994 and competed in singles until the end of 2008, before joining an ice ballet for two years.

In 2010, Zaboev began competing in pair skating with Alexandra Herbríková for the Czech Republic. They were coached by Stanislav Žídek and Otto Dlabola in Ostrava.

Zaboev teamed up with Natalja Zabijako to compete for Estonia. They began training together on 19 September 2012. By finishing ninth at the 2013 Nebelhorn Trophy, they earned a spot for Estonia in pair skating at the 2014 Winter Olympics in Sochi. Zaboev applied for Estonian citizenship, required to represent the country at the Olympics, but in November 2013, Estonia denied his fast-track application.

Zabijako/Zaboev placed tenth at the 2014 European Championships and 19th at the 2014 World Championships. On April 6, 2014, Sport Express reported that their partnership had ended.

On July 6, 2015, it was announced that Zaboev had teamed up with Japanese pair skater Narumi Takahashi to compete for Japan. Their partnership was short-lived.

Programs

With Zabijako

With Herbríková

Competitive highlights 
JGP: Junior Grand Prix

With Zabijako for Estonia

With Herbríková for the Czech Republic

References

External links 

 
 

1989 births
Estonian male pair skaters
Russian male pair skaters
Living people
Sportspeople from Yekaterinburg
People from Ashburn, Virginia